The Groysman government was formed on 14 April 2016, led by Volodymyr Groysman.  It was the third Ukrainian cabinet formed since the 2014 Ukrainian revolution, following on from the first and second Yatsenyuk governments.

History

Formation

On 10 April 2016 Arseniy Yatsenyuk announced that he would resign as Prime Minister and would ask parliament to fire him on 12 April 2016. On 25 March 2016 Parliamentary Speaker Volodymyr Groysman had been nominated by coalition partner Petro Poroshenko Bloc to replace Yatsenyuk. On 12 April parliament did not hold a vote on Yatsenyuk's resignation, because (Yatsenyuk's party) People's Front and Petro Poroshenko Bloc could not agree on the forming of a new government. On 14 April Groysman was confirmed by the Verkhovna Rada (Ukraine's parliament) as Prime Minister.

As Petro Poroshenko Bloc and People's Front together lacked a parliamentary majority (and a couple of both parties' parliamentarians voted "against" the Groysman government) the government creation became possible because almost all MP's of Revival and People's Will voted for the establishment of the coalition.

Parliamentary voting

Additional decisions

Composition
Under the Constitution of Ukraine the Ukrainian President submits nominations to parliament for the post of Minister of Foreign Affairs and Minister of Defense. When the Groysman Government was installed Pavlo Klimkin was reappointed as Foreign minister and Stepan Poltorak was reappointed as Minister of Defence.

The post of Minister of Health is vacant since the Groysman Government was formed (on 14 April 2016). Naturalised Ukrainian American Ulana Suprun was appointed acting Minister on 27 July 2016. On 11 July 2015 President Petro Poroshenko had granted Suprun Ukrainian citizenship.

After a conflict with Prime Minister Groysman the Verkhovna Rada on 7 June 2018 dismissed Finance Minister Oleksandr Danylyuk, the next day Oksana Markarova was appointed acting Finance Minister. On 22 November 2018 parliament appointed her as Finance Minister. The same day Iryna Friz was appointed to the new post of Minister of Veterans Affairs. On 27 February 2018 parliament has adopted an appeal to the Cabinet of Ministers on the creation of this Ministry for Veterans Affairs.

Agriculture Minister Taras Kutovy was dismissed by parliament on 22 November 2018, on 7 December 2018 Maxim Martynyuk was appointed acting Minister of Agriculture.

References

Ukrainian governments
Cabinets established in 2016
2016 establishments in Ukraine
8th Ukrainian Verkhovna Rada
Cabinets disestablished in 2019
2019 disestablishments in Ukraine